"L.A. Freeway" is a song written by Guy Clark in 1970, a few months after he moved from California to Nashville, Tennessee. It was originally recorded by Jerry Jeff Walker for his self-titled 1972 album, and then released by Clark in 1975 on his debut album Old No. 1. It has been covered by artists including Steve Earle and Yellowstone actor Ryan Bingham.

References 

Jerry Jeff Walker songs
Songs written by Guy Clark
1970 songs